BenQ Corporation  is a Taiwanese multinational company that sells and markets technology products, consumer electronics, computing and communications devices under the "BenQ" brand name, which stands for the company slogan Bringing Enjoyment N Quality to life. Its principal products include TFT LCD monitors, digital projectors, digital cameras, and mobile computing devices.

BenQ's head office is located in Taipei, and the company operates five branch offices in the Asia-Pacific, Europe, China, Latin America and North America, and employs over 1,300 individuals. The "BenQ" brand is present in more than 100 countries worldwide.

History
BenQ was originally founded in 1984, then spun off from Acer in 2001 to provide a separate branded channel. In 2006 Acer disposed of its remaining shares in BenQ.

BenQ's first mobile phone was the M775C, which was released in 2003. During Q1 2004, eight new phones were announced, ranging from bar and clamshell phones to Windows Mobile smartphones. A further seven phones, mainly clamshells, came in 2005.

BenQ-Siemens

On 1 October 2005, BenQ Corp. acquired the mobile devices division of Germany's Siemens AG, becoming the sixth-largest company in the mobile phone industry by accumulated market share. The acquisition results in a new business group, BenQ Mobile, of BenQ Corporation entirely dedicated to wireless communications. Mobile phones of the new group are marketed under a new brand, BenQ-Siemens.

In late September 2006, the mobile devices division of BenQ, BenQ Mobile (Germany), announced bankruptcy when BenQ Corp. discontinued its funding.  As a result, BenQ Mobile was placed under the supervision of a state-appointed bankruptcy administrator. In February 2007, BenQ Mobile was finally disbanded as a suitable buyer could not be found. An estimated 2000 BenQ Mobile employees lost their jobs. On 24 August 2006 BenQ announced plans to spin off its manufacturing operations in early 2007, separating contract manufacturing and own-brand divisions.

After Siemens
After BenQ-Siemens, BenQ continued to make phones, primarily aimed at the Asian market (although one was also released in Europe).

This is a list of BenQ phones during the post-BenQ-Siemens brands period between 2009-2012:
BenQ T33
BenQ T51
BenQ C30 (BenQ-Siemens C31) 
BenQ E72 (Windows Mobile smartphone. Also released in Europe) (Not a E71 Successors) 
BenQ M7 (BenQ-Siemens M81 spirituality  success's)
BenQ T60 
BenQ E53
BenQ C36 (BenQ-Siemens C31 Successors)
BenQ E55 
BenQ MOMODESIGN MD300H (HSDPA) (this is a co-brands in exclusively project of gadgets for MOMODESIGN, the most rarest model of BenQ Mobile because the phone was made available in limited quantities volumes not over 5,000 units.)

After a hiatus, BenQ resumed production of smartphones under its own brand in 2013.

Smartphones
Dell Venue Pro
Qisda Corporation, the parent company of BenQ, manufactured smartphones for Dell, which were marketed under the Venue Pro name, and which ran Windows Phone 7. The phone was made available in limited quantities on 8 November 2010 with the launch of Windows Phone. Delivery of the phone met severe setbacks, it was riled with numerous hardware issues, and the device was discontinued as of 8 March 2012.

Android
BenQ A3 — made for the Asian market, runs Android 4.1 Jelly Bean
BenQ T3 
BenQ F5 RAM 2GB, runs Android 4.4.2 KitKat

EE (UK)
Starting in 2015 BenQ manufactured the Harrier and Harrier Mini Android Smartphones for the UK mobile telecoms provider EE.

Corporate restructuring

On 24 August 2006, BenQ announced plans to spin off its manufacturing operations in early 2007, separating contract manufacturing and own-brand divisions.

In April 2007, considering that the branded business has achieved sufficient profit and scale to sustain and grow its operation independently, BenQ announced the plan to spin off its branded business. After the spin-off, BenQ Corporation was renamed Qisda Corporation, which will focus on integrated manufacturing service business, and the spun-off company has succeeded the name of BenQ Corporation, which is a 100% owned subsidiary of Qisda Corp.

On 3 September 2007, the newly spun-off BenQ Corporation commenced its new operation to continue selling and marketing products under the BenQ brand name.

Acquiring Zowie Gear 
On 10 December 2015, BenQ announced that ZOWIE GEAR would become their new gaming division. Their newer products include mice, mouse pads, sound cards, monitors, and other gaming accessories. The BenQ ZOWIE monitors are used by around 45% of professional gamers.

MOBIUZ Gaming 
In July 2020, BenQ announced the launch of its new MOBIUZ gaming monitor series. MOBIUZ monitors introduce a new HDRi adaptive technology that optimizes the HDR effect based on light conditions and built-in treVolo speakers and proprietary Eye-Care technology.

MODELS
 EX2510S
 EX2710S
 EX2710R
 EX2710Q
 EX2710U
 EX3210R
 EX3210U
 EX3410R
 EX3415R

EX3210R Night Runner's Edition (DL2) 
In  2022 BenQ MOBIUZ partners with Techland and introduce EX3210R: Dying Light 2 Stay Human Night Runner’s Edition Curved Monitor (limited edition). The model is a 32" monitor with a 1000R curved display, built-in sound system, and HDRi technology.

See also
List of digital camera brands
Products of Acquired Siemens Mobile Division
List of companies of Taiwan

References

External links

 

Acer Inc. acquisitions
Companies based in Taipei
Companies listed on the Taiwan Stock Exchange
Consumer electronics brands
Display technology companies
Electronics companies established in 1984
Taiwanese companies established in 1984
Electronics companies of Taiwan
Mobile phone manufacturers
Portable audio player manufacturers
Taiwanese brands
Video equipment manufacturers
Optical computer storage